The year 664 BC was a year of the pre-Julian Roman calendar. In the Roman Empire, it was known as year 90 Ab urbe condita . The denomination 664 BC for this year has been used since the early medieval period, when the Anno Domini calendar era became the prevalent method in Europe for naming years.

Events
 First naval battle in Greek recorded history, between Corinth and Corcyra.
 Tantamani succeeds his uncle Taharqa as king of Kush.
 Kushites invade Assyrian-controlled Egypt.
 The Assyrians under Ashurbanipal capture and sack Thebes, Egypt.
 Psamtik I succeeds Necho I as ruler of Lower Egypt.

Births
 Amon, king of Judah (approximate date)

Deaths
 Taharqa, king of Egypt
 Necho I, king of Egypt
 Duke Xuan of Qin, ruler of the state of Qin

References

 
Ancient Corcyra
660s BC